TAP TV (stylized as tap TV) is a 24-hour Philippine pay television channel owned by TAP Digital Media Ventures Corporation. It is launched on April 14, 2019. A former sports channel, it currently broadcasts as a general entertainment channel since November 4, 2020.

History
On April 14, 2019, TAP DMV launched a secondary channel of TAP Sports, focusing on airing live coverages and highlights of every WTA tournaments. On February 17, 2020, the WTA events (along with its men's counterpart ATP) were moved to a new tennis-dedicated channel Premier Tennis, while TAP Sports 2 was reformatted as TAP W and began shifting its focus on women's sports.

On November 2, 2020, TAP DMV relaunched TAP W as TAP TV, reformatted as a general entertainment channel. The first program aired on TAP TV was The Today Show.

Programming
TAP TV's current schedule consists of canned programming from the United States, the United Kingdom and Australia, and has programming distribution/output arrangements with Comcast (NBCUniversal, Peacock, and Sky UK) and ITV Studios. It includes news, talk shows, reality dramas & lifestyle.

Current programs
 NBC Nightly News
 The Today Show
 The Kelly Clarkson Show
 The Tonight Show Starring Jimmy Fallon
 Heads Up!
 Miracle Hunter
 Food Unwrapped
 Who Do You Think You Are? USA
 Design Junkies
 Superfoods: The Real Story
 Culinary Bluprint
 ES.TV
 Hell's Kitchen USA
 Love Island USA
 Keeping Up with the Kardashians
 The Voice UK
 The Voice Kids UK
 Top Chef
 A.P. Bio
 E! True Hollywood Story
 The Wine Show
 Connecting
 Songland
 Love Island USA
 Revenge Body with Khloé Kardashian
 The Bold Type
 10 Things You Don't Know
 Celebrity Obsessed
 Brooklyn Nine-Nine
 Young Rock

Sports
ISU Figure Skating Championships

Special events coverage 
 Macy's Thanksgiving Day Parade (since 2020)

Former programs
 Daily Pop
 Ellen's Design Challenge
 Good Girls
 Hit Flix (formerly TAP TV Sunday Movies)
 Little Big Shots USA
 Little Big Shots: Forever Young

References

Television in the Philippines
English-language television stations in the Philippines
Television channels and stations established in 2019
Women's interest channels
Television networks in the Philippines
2019 establishments in the Philippines
TAP Digital Media Ventures Corporation